Christina Warren is an American journalist, podcaster, and speaker known for her writing about technology, new media, and popular culture.

Work
Warren began her career as a freelance writer for USA Today in 2007, where she wrote about American Idol as an "Idol Coach". She went on to write for The Unofficial Apple Weblog and DownloadSquad.com. She was a co-host on the DownloadSquad's show, The Squadcast.

In 2009 Warren joined Mashable as a staff writer focusing on Apple, mobile tech and gadgets.

In 2014 she appeared on CNN to discuss the Ebola outbreak and the role of social media in sharing information related to the epidemic.

In August 2016 it was reported that Warren had left Mashable to join Gizmodo "as senior technology writer, a role that will see her as a marquis [sic] voice in defining Gizmodo’s point of view on the major stories of the day".

She is a co-host of multiple podcast shows covering popular culture and technology. She co-hosts the technology-focused show Rocket on the Relay FM podcast network alongside Brianna Wu and Simone de Rochefort. In 2014, she started the Overtired podcast with Brett Terpstra on the Electronic Shadow Network. 
Warren has interviewed many well-known members of the tech industry including Fred Wilson, venture capitalist and Jony Ive, Chief Design Officer at Apple Inc.

In August 2016 Warren starred in a music video by the indie rock band Airplane Mode.

As of May 22, 2017 she works for Microsoft, as a Senior Cloud Developer Advocate, where she among other things hosts This Week in Channel 9.

Personal life 
Born in Lawrenceville, Georgia, Christina Warren currently resides in Seattle, Washington with her husband, Grant.

References

External links
 Official website
 Christina Warren on Twitter

Living people
People from Lawrenceville, Georgia
1982 births
American women podcasters
American podcasters
American technology writers
Georgia State University alumni
Women technology writers
Journalists from Georgia (U.S. state)
21st-century American journalists
21st-century American women writers
Microsoft people